West Fulton is a hamlet in Schoharie County, New York, United States. West Fulton has a post office with ZIP code 12194.

References

Hamlets in Schoharie County, New York
Hamlets in New York (state)